The National Geology Museum is located on Şoseaua Kiseleff (street), in Bucharest, Romania.  It is located near Victory Square and Kiseleff Park, in central Bucharest. 

The museum hosts a collection of 80,000 samples of rocks, fossils, and minerals from Romania.

Architecture
The building was built in 1906 for the Geological Institute of Romania.  It was designed by architect Victor Ștefănescu, in the Romanian Revival style.

External links
Museum gallery and paleontological exhibits
Geology.ro: Official Muzeul National de Geologie website 

Museums in Bucharest
Geology museums
Historic monuments in Bucharest
Buildings and structures completed in 1906
1906 establishments in Romania